First Republic may refer to:

Businesses
First Republic Bank, of San Francisco, California, U.S.
First Republic Bank Corporation, of Dallas, Texas, U.S.

Governments

Africa
 First Egyptian Republic (1953–1958)
 First Republic of Madagascar (1958–1972)
 First Republic of Ghana (1960–1966)
 First Republic in the Constitution of Niger (1960–1989)
 First Nigerian Republic (1963–1966)
 First Republic of Uganda (1963–1971)
 First Republic of Sierra Leone (1971–1992)

Americas
 First Vermont Republic (1777–1791)
 First Republic of Venezuela (1811–1812)
 First Mexican Republic (1824–1835)
 First Dominican Republic (1844–1861)
 First Costa Rican Republic (1848–1948)
 First Brazilian Republic (1889–1930)
 First Republic of New Granada, Colombia (1810–1816)

Asia
 First Philippine Republic (1899–1901)
 First Republic of China (1912–1928)
 First Republic of Armenia (1918–1920)
 First Republic of Azerbaijan (1918–1920)
 First Republic of Georgia, also known as the "Democratic Republic of Georgia" (1918–921)
 First Syrian Republic (1930–1950)
 First East Turkestan Republic (1933–1934)
 First Republic of Korea (1948–1960)
 First Republic of the Maldives (1952–1954)
 First Republic of Vietnam (1955–1963)
 First Cambodian Republic (1970–1975)
 First Republic of Afghanistan, also known as the "Republic of Afghanistan" (1973–1978)

Europe
 First Roman Republic, established c. 508 BC
 First Polish Republic, an informal term for the Polish–Lithuanian Commonwealth (1569–1795)
 French First Republic (1792–1804)
 First Hellenic Republic, sometimes used for Greece during the War of Independence (1822–1832)
 First Spanish Republic (1873–1874)
 First Portuguese Republic (1910–1926)
 First Hungarian Republic (1918–1920)
 First Czechoslovak Republic (1918–1938)
 First Austrian Republic (1919–1934)
 First Slovak Republic (1939–1945)
 First Italian Republic (1948–1994)
 First Republic of Kosovo (1991–1999)

Other uses
 First Republic Square, Tbilisi, Georgia
 The First Republic, a Czech television show

See also

Republic First Bancorp, of Philadelphia, Pennsylvania, U.S.

Second Republic
Third Republic
Fourth Republic
Fifth Republic
Sixth Republic
Seventh Republic